Udon Thani railway station is a railway station located in Mak Khaeng Sub-district, Mueang Udon Thani District, Udon Thani Province.

History 
The station opened in June 24, 1941, as part of the Northeastern Line Khon Kaen–Udon Thani section. In September 1955, the line extended to Na Tha railway station (at the time Nong Khai main station).

Train services 
As of January 2021, 12 trains serve Udon Thani railway station. The trains in number and class order are the following:

 Special Express "Isanmakkha" 25/26 Bangkok–Nong Khai–Bangkok
 Express 75/76 Bangkok–Nong Khai–Bangkok
 Express 77/78 Bangkok–Nong Khai–Bangkok
 Rapid 133/134 Bangkok–Nong Khai–Bangkok
 Local 415/418 Nakhon Ratchasima–Nong Khai–Nakhon Ratchasima
 Local 417/416 Udon Thani–Nakhon Ratchasima–Udon Thani

Due to COVID-19 pandemic in Thailand, 4 trains serve Udon Thani railway station from 30 April 2021 until 31 May 2021.

 Rapid 133/134 Bangkok–Nong Khai–Bangkok
 Local 415/418 Nakhon Ratchasima–Nong Khai–Nakhon Ratchasima

References 

Railway stations in Thailand
Railway stations opened in 1941